Daniel Leonard Navarrete Muktans (born March 28, 1977, in Caracas, Venezuela) is a Venezuelan model who won the title of Mister Venezuela in 2001. He represented Vargas state.

Navarrete was the official representative of Venezuela for the Manhunt International 2002 pageant in Shanghai, China, on November 9, 2002, when he placed as  4th runner up.

References

External links
Manhunt International official website
Monarcas de Venezuela Blog
Miss Venezuela La Nueva Era MB

Male beauty pageant winners
Living people
1977 births
People from Caracas